Heim Pál National Pediatric Institute is a children's hospital located in several locations in  Budapest, Hungary.

History
Heim Pál National Pediatric Institute was founded in 1907 as an educational and health institution for orphaned children. Throughout and after the First World War it operated as an orphanage.

After the Second World War it was renovated and became a national institute for treating children. In 1953 it was named after János Bókai, a famous Hungarian pediatrician of the 19th century and a few years later it was renamed after Pál Heim, another famous pediatrician. By this time the Children's Hospital was operating with 555 beds. In 2005 the Children's Hospital was merged with Madarász utcai Gyermekkórház, another well known and respected Hungarian children's hospital.

Today Heim Pál National Pediatric Institute is one of Hungary's most prominent children's hospitals.

References

External links
 

Hospitals in Budapest
1907 establishments in Austria-Hungary